Steven Cummins (born 29 March 1992) is an Australian professional rugby union player, currently signed with Melbourne-based Super Rugby side, the . He was previously a member of Welsh Pro 14 team Scarlets. His regular position is lock and he also plays at blind-side flanker.

Early life and rugby

Cummins was born in Sydney and attended The Hills Sports High, captaining their first XV in 2010. He was also named captain of the New South Wales All Schools team in the same year, as well as the Australian Schoolboy team.

In 2011, Cummins captained the Australia Under-19 side and he was a member of the Australia Under-20 team that played at the 2012 IRB Junior World Championship.

Cummins played in the Shute Shield competition with Eastwood, impressing coach John Manenti, who said:
Steve Cummins has established himself as a real hard worker with huge involvements at the tackle and breakdown areas.

In 2013, Cummins played for the Sydney-based Super Rugby franchise side the ' emerging side, Gen Blue in the Pacific Rugby Cup.

Rugby career

Eastern Province Kings

On 3 June 2014, the  announced Cummins as one of three new signings prior to the 2014 Currie Cup Premier Division season. He joined them on a short-term contract for the remainder of 2014.

Two days later, Cummins was selected on the bench for the  side to face  during a tour match during a 2014 incoming tour. He came on as a late substitute, playing the last six minutes as the Kings suffered a 12–34 defeat.

Cummins started the opening match of the Currie Cup season, but was on the losing side as  secured a 35–16 victory.

Cummins made a total of eight appearances in Eastern Province Kings colours during his short spell in Port Elizabeth.

Melbourne Rebels

On the same day that Cummins was announced as an EP Kings player, the  also announced that Cummins signed a contract to join them as an Extended Playing Squad (EPS) member for the 2015 Super Rugby season. In early 2015, it was announced that Cummins had re-signed with the Melbourne Rebels for a further two years

Scarlets
Cummins signed with Welsh team Scarlets in November 2017.

Super Rugby statistics

References

Australian rugby union players
Living people
1992 births
Eastern Province Elephants players
Melbourne Rebels players
Melbourne Rising players
Rugby union players from Sydney
Australian expatriate rugby union players
Australian expatriate sportspeople in South Africa
Expatriate rugby union players in South Africa
Rugby union locks
Scarlets players
Section Paloise players
Expatriate rugby union players in Wales
Expatriate rugby union players in France